George Staudenmayer (December 3, 1857 – November 27, 1939) was a member of the Wisconsin State Senate.

Biography
Staudenmayer was born on December 3, 1857 in Caledonia, Columbia County, Wisconsin to Eva Margarethe Naser and John G. Staudenmayer. He made his living farming and threshing. He married Margaret McLeish (1864–1914), with whom he raised at least nine children. Staudenmayer died November 27, 1939, and is interred in Portage, Wisconsin.

Political career
Staudenmayer was first elected to the Senate in 1914 as a Democrat. In 1918 and 1922, he was re-elected as a Republican. In addition, he was chairman of Caledonia.

References

1857 births
1939 deaths
People from Columbia County, Wisconsin
Wisconsin state senators
Wisconsin Republicans
Wisconsin Democrats